The 1928 Utah Agricultural Aggies football team was an American football team that represented Utah Agricultural College in the Rocky Mountain Conference (RMC) during the 1928 college football season. In their 10th season under head coach Dick Romney, the Aggies compiled a 5–3–1 record (4–2–1 against RMC opponents), finished fourth in the conference, and outscored opponents by a total of 182 to 87.

Schedule

References

Utah Agricultural
Utah State Aggies football seasons
Utah Agricultural Football